Minnesota State Highway 99 (MN 99) is a  highway in south-central Minnesota, which runs from its intersection with State Highway 111 in Nicollet and continues east to its eastern terminus at its intersection with State Highway 21 in Erin Township, near the city of Faribault.

MN 99 passes through the cities of St. Peter and Le Center.

Route description

Highway 99 serves as an east–west route in south-central Minnesota between Nicollet, St. Peter, Cleveland, Le Center, and Faribault.

The route is also known as 3rd Street in the town of Nicollet.

Highway 99 follows Minnesota Avenue for 16 blocks in the city of St. Peter.  The route is concurrent with U.S. Highway 169 and State Highway 22 throughout this length.

The route crosses the Minnesota River at St. Peter.

Highway 99 is also known as Derrynane Street in the city of Le Center.

History
Highway 99 was authorized on April 22, 1933. It was posted in 1934 and included parts of what were previously State Highways 7 and 21. It was paved between Nicollet and Le Center at this time. The section between Le Center and Highway 13 was paved in 1939, and the last section between Highway 13 and Highway 21 was paved in 1952.

Until the mid-1950s, Highway 99 turned directly north at Cleveland along what is now County Road 15 to intersect Highway 112. A shortcut heading northeast to Le Center was begun in 1953 and completed by 1956.

Major intersections

References

External links

 
 Details of Routes 76 to 100, Steve Riner's Unofficial Minnesota Highways Page

099
Transportation in Nicollet County, Minnesota
Transportation in Le Sueur County, Minnesota
Transportation in Rice County, Minnesota